Last of the Wilds may refer to:

"Erämaan viimeinen", a song by Nightwish
Last of the Wilds, a novel in the Age of the Five trilogy by Trudi Canavan

See also 
 Last of the Wild, a Wildlife Conservation Society initiative